Anna Maria Catharina (Annemiek) Padt-Jansen (15 August 1921, in Naarden – 18 March 2007, in Bilthoven) was a Dutch harpist and politician. She was a member of the House of Representatives for the Labour Party from June 1969 until 10 May 1971 and again from 14 March 1972 until 7 December 1972. She was also a member of the board of the public broadcasting association VARA. She was a sister of the stand-up comedian .

Political Positions

During her time in parliament she was focused on children's rights and the emancipation of women and sexual minorities. Despite being a Roman Catholic, she believed that religion did not have a place in public life, and when sworn in as a member of parliament, she chose to take a secular, rather than religious, oath.

Personal life

Padt-Jansen was a Roman Catholic. She was married to Frans Jacob Padt until his death in 1969, and never remarried.

References 

1921 births
2007 deaths
Conservatorium van Amsterdam alumni
Dutch harpists
Labour Party (Netherlands) politicians
Members of the House of Representatives (Netherlands)
People from Naarden
20th-century Dutch women politicians
20th-century Dutch politicians